Richard Harold Edmunds (27 May 1970 – 10 December 1989) was an English cricketer. He was a right-handed batsman and a left-arm medium-fast bowler who played for Leicestershire. He was born in Oakham and died in Leicester.

Edmunds made two first-class appearances during the 1989 season for the team, making a duck in his debut innings but scoring 17 in the second, against  Gloucestershire. He also took two wickets during the match. Edmunds' second and final match was less impressive, as he was trapped leg before wicket off the bowling of Chris Cowdrey for a duck in the only innings in which he batted.

Edmunds also made three List A appearances for the team during the season. Edmunds played in two Youth Test matches for England Young Cricketers against New Zealand in the summer of 1989, and three Youth One-Day Internationals during the same tour.

Edmunds died in 1989 aged 19, as a result of injuries received in a car crash near his home in Oakham on 22 November.

References

1970 births
1989 deaths
Cricketers from Rutland
English cricketers
Leicestershire cricketers
People from Oakham
Road incident deaths in England